Jasper Lindsten (born June 30, 1994) is a Finnish ice hockey player. His is currently playing with Porin Ässät in the Finnish Liiga.

Lindsten made his SM-liiga debut playing with HC TPS during the 2020–2013.

References

External links

1994 births
Living people
Finnish ice hockey centres
People from Salo, Finland
Ässät players
Sportspeople from Southwest Finland